The 2021–22 Portland Pilots men's basketball team represented the University of Portland during the 2021–22 NCAA Division I men's basketball season. The Pilots, led by first-year head coach Shantay Legans, played their home games at the Chiles Center as members of the West Coast Conference.

The Pilots played in the inaugural 2022 The Basketball Classic tournament, and were eliminated in the quarterfinals.

Previous season 
In a season limited due to the ongoing COVID-19 pandemic, the Pilots finished the 2020–21 season 6–15, 0–11 in WCC play to finish in last place. They lost in the first round of the WCC tournament to Santa Clara.

On February 5, 2021, head coach Terry Porter was fired after 17 games. Assistant Ben Johnson coached the team for the remainder of the season. On March 22, the school named Eastern Washington head coach Shantay Legans as the team's new head coach.

Offseason

Departures

Incoming transfers

2021 recruiting class

Roster

Schedule and results
The Pilots January 8 game against Santa Clara was postponed due to COVID-19 protocols. The game was rescheduled for February 14, but Santa Clara canceled the game on February 10. The Pilots scheduled a game against NAIA Buhsnell on February 15.
|-
!colspan=9 style=| Exhibition

|-
!colspan=9 style=| Regular season

|-
!colspan=9 style=| WCC tournament

|-
!colspan=9 style=| The Basketball Classic

Source: Schedule

References

Portland
Portland Pilots men's basketball seasons
Portland Pilots men's basketball
Portland Pilots men's basketball
Port
Port
Portland Pilots